Ghassan Kanafani (8 April 1936 – 8 July 1972) was a Palestinian author and a leading member of the Popular Front for the Liberation of Palestine (PFLP). On 8 July 1972, he was assassinated by Mossad.

Early life 
Ghassan Fayiz Kanafani was born in 1936 into a middle-class Palestinian Sunni family with a Kurdish background in the city of Acre (Akka) under the British Mandate for Palestine. He was the third child of Muhammad Fayiz Abd al Razzag, a lawyer who was active in the national movement that opposed the British occupation and its encouragement of Jewish immigration, and who had been imprisoned on several occasions by the British when Ghassan was still a child.   Ghassan received his early education in a  French Catholic missionary school in Jaffa.

In May, when the outbreak of hostilities in the 1948 Arab–Israeli War spilled over into Acre, Kanafani and his family were forced into exile,  joining  the Palestinian exodus. In a letter to his own son written decades later, he recalled the intense shame he felt on observing, aged 10,  the men of his family surrendering their weapons to become refugees. They were relatively poor; the father set up a small lawyer's practice, with the family income being supplemented by the boys' part-time work. There, Kanafani completed his secondary education, receiving a United Nations Relief and Works Agency for Palestine Refugees (UNRWA) teaching certificate in 1952. He was first employed as an art teacher for some 1,200 displaced Palestinian children in a refugee camp, where he began writing short stories in order to help his students contextualize their situation.

Political background 

In 1952, he also enrolled in the Department of Arabic Literature at the University of Damascus. The following year, he met George Habash, who introduced him to politics and was to exercise an important influence on his early work. In 1955, before he could complete his degree, with a thesis on "Race and Religion in Zionist Literature", which was to form the basis for his 1967 study On Zionist Literature, Kanafani was expelled from the university for his political affiliations with the Movement of Arab Nationalists (MAN) to which Habash had recruited him. Kanafani moved to Kuwait in 1956, following his sister Fayzah Kanafani the brother who had preceded him there, to take up a teaching position. He spent much of his free time absorbed in Russian literature. In the following year he became editor of Jordanian Al Ra'i (The Opinion), which was an MAN-affiliated newspaper.

In 1960, he relocated again, this time to Beirut, on the advice of Habash, where he began editing the MAN mouthpiece al-Hurriya and took up an interest in Marxist philosophy and politics. In 1961, he met Anni Høver, a Danish educationalist and children's rights activist, with whom he had two children. In 1962, Kanafani was forced to briefly go underground since he, as a stateless person, lacked proper identification papers. He reappeared in Beirut later the same year, and took up editorship of the Nasserist newspaper Al Muharrir (The Liberator), editing its weekly supplement "Filastin" (Palestine). He went on to become an editor of another Nasserist newspaper, Al Anwar (The Illumination), in 1967, writing essays under the pseudonym of Faris Faris. He was also editor of Assayad magazine which was the sister publication of Al Anwar. In the same year  he also joined The Popular Front for the Liberation of Palestine and in 1969, resigned from Al Anwar to edit the PFLP's weekly magazine, Al Hadaf ("The Goal"), while drafting a PFLP program in which the movement officially took up Marxism-Leninism. This marked a departure from pan-Arab nationalism towards revolutionary Palestinian struggle. Kanafani was also one of the contributors of Lotus, a magazine launched in 1968 and financed by Egypt and the Soviet Union. At the time of his assassination, he held extensive contacts with foreign journalists and many Scandinavian anti-Zionist Jews. His political writings and journalism are thought to have made a major impact on Arab thought and strategy at the time.

Literary output
Though prominent as a political thinker, militant, and journalist, Kanafani is on record as stating that literature was the shaping spirit behind his politics. Kanafani's literary style has been described as "lucid and straightforward"; his  modernist narrative technnique—using flashback effects and a wide range of narrative voices—represents a distinct advance in Arabic fiction. Ihab Shalback and Faisal Darraj sees a trajectory in Kanafani's writings from the simplistic dualism depicting an evil Zionist aggressor to a good Palestinian victim, to a moral affirmation of the justness of the Palestinian cause where however good and evil are not absolutes, until, dissatisfied by both, he began to appreciate that self-knowledge required understanding of the Other, and that only by unifying both distinct narratives could one grasp the deeper dynamics of the conflict.

In many of his fictions, he portrays the complex dilemmas Palestinians of various backgrounds must face. Kanafani was the first to deploy the notion of  resistance literature ("adab al-muqawama") with regard to Palestinian writing; in two works, published respectively in 1966 and 1968, one critic, Orit Bashkin, has noted that his novels repeat a certain fetishistic worship of arms, and that he appears to depict military means as the only way to resolve the Palestinian tragedy.
Ghassan Kanafani began writing short stories when he was working in the refugee camps. Often told as seen through the eyes of children, the stories manifested out of his political views and belief that his students' education had to relate to their immediate surroundings. While in Kuwait, he spent much time reading Russian literature and socialist theory, refining many of the short stories he wrote, winning a Kuwaiti prize.

Men in the Sun (1962)
In 1962, his novel, Men in the Sun (Rijal fi-a-shams), reputed to be "one of the most admired and quoted works in modern Arabic fiction," was published to great critical acclaim. Rashid Khalidi considers  it "prescient". The story is an allegory of Palestinian calamity in the wake of the nakba in its description of the defeatist despair, passivity, and political corruption infesting the lives of Palestinians in refugee camps. The central character is an embittered ex-soldier, Abul Khaizuran, disfigured and rendered impotent by his wounds, whose cynical pursuit of money often damages his fellow countrymen. Three Palestinians, the elderly Abu Qais, Assad, and the youth Marwan, hide in the empty water tank of a lorry in order to cross the border into Kuwait. They have managed to get through as Basra and drew up to the last checkpoint.  Abul Khaizuran, the truck driver, tries to be brisk but is dragged into defending his honor as the Iraqi checkpoint officer teases him by suggesting he had been dallying with prostitutes. The intensity of heat within the water carrier is such that no one could survive more than several minutes, and indeed they expire inside as Khaizuran is drawn into trading anecdotes that play up a non-existent virility—they address him as though he were effeminized, with the garrulous Abu Baqir  outside in an office. Their deaths are to be blamed, not on the effect of the stifling effect of the sun's heat, but on their maintaining silence as they suffer. The ending has often been read as a trope for the futility of Palestinian attempts to try an build a new identity far away from their native Palestine, and the figure of Abul Khaizuran a symbol of the impotence of the Palestinian leadership. Amy Zalman has detected a covert leitmotif embedded in the tale, in which Palestine is figured as the beloved female body, while the male figures are castrated from being productive in their attempts to seek another country. In this reading, a real national identity for Palestinians can only be reconstituted by marrying awareness of gender to aspirations to return.   A film based on the story, Al-Makhdu'un (The Betrayed or The Dupes), was produced by Tewfik Saleh in 1972.

All That's Left to You (1966)
All That's Left to You (Ma Tabaqqah Lakum) (1966) is set in a refugee camp in  the Gaza Strip. It deals with a woman, Maryam, and her brother, Hamid, both orphaned in the 1948 war, their father dying in combat—his last words being a demand that they abstain from marriage until the national cause has been won—and  their mother separated from them in the flight from Jaffa. She turns up in Jordan, they end up with an aunt in Gaza, and live united in a set of Oedipal displacements; Hamid seeks a mother-substitute in his sister, while Maryam entertains a quasi incestuous love for her brother. Maryam eventually breaks the paternal prohibition to marry a two-time traitor, Zakaria, since he is bigamous, and because he gave the Israelis information to capture an underground fighter, resulting in the latter's death. Hamid, outraged, tramps off through the Negev, aspiring to reach their mother in Jordan. The two episodes of Hamid in the desert, and Maryam in the throes of her relationship with Zakaria, are interwoven into a simultaneous cross-narrative: the young man encounters a wandering Israeli soldier who has lost contact with his unit, and wrestles his armaments from him, and ends up undergoing a kind of rebirth as he struggles with the desert. Maryam, challenged by her husband to abort their child, whom she will call Hamid, decides to save the child by killing Zakaria. This story won the Lebanese Literary prize in that year.

Umm Sa'ad (1969)
In Umm Sa'ad (1969), the impact of his new revolutionary outlook is explicit as he creates the portrait of a mother who encourages her son to take up arms as a resistance fedayeen in full awareness that the choice of life might eventuate in his death.

Return to Haifa (1970)
Return to Haifa (A'id lla Hayfa) (1970) is the story of a Palestinian couple, Sa'id and his wife Safiyya, who have been living for nearly two decades in the Palestinian town of Ramallah, which was under Jordanian administration until it and the rest of the West Bank were conquered in the Six-Day War. The couple must learn to face the fact that their five-month-old child, a son they were forced to leave behind in their home in Haifa in 1948, has been raised as an Israeli Jew, an echo of the Solomonic judgement. The father searches for the real Palestine through the rubble of memory, only to find more rubble.  The Israeli occupation means that they have finally an opportunity to go back and visit Haifa in Israel. The journey to his home in the district of Halisa on the al-jalil mountain evokes the past as he once knew it. The dissonance between the remembered Palestinian past and the remade Israeli present of Haifa and its environs creates a continuous diasporic anachronism. The novel deals with two decisive days, one 21 April 1948, the other 30 June 1967; the earlier date relates to the period when the Haganah launched its assault on the city and Palestinians who were not killed in resistance actions fled. Sa'id and his wife were ferried out on British boats to Acre. A Polish Jew and Holocaust survivor, Evrat Kushan, and his wife, Miriam, find their son Khaldun in their home, and take over the property and raise the toddler as a Jew, with the new name "Dov". When they visit the home, Kushen's wife greets them with the words: "I've been expecting you for the a long time." Kushen's recall of the events of April 1948 confirms Sa'id's own impression, that the fall of the town was coordinated by the British forces and the Haganah. Their other son, Khalid, with them in Ramallah, had joined the fedayeen with his father's blessing. When Dov returns, he is wearing an IDF uniform, and vindictively resentful of the fact they abandoned him. Compelled by the scene to leave the home, the father reflects that only military action can settle the dispute, realizing however that, in such an eventuality, it may well be that Dov/Khaldun will confront his brother Khalid in battle. The novel conveys nonetheless a criticism of Palestinians for the act of abandonment, and betrays a certain admiration for the less than easy, stubborn insistence of Zionists, whose sincerity and determination must be the model for Palestinians in their future struggle. Ariel Bloch indeed argues that Dov functions, when he rails against his father's weakness, as a mouthpiece for Kanafani himself. Sa'id symbolizes irresolute Palestinians who have buried the memory of their flight and betrayal of their homeland. At the same time, the homeland can no longer be based on a nostalgic filiation with the past as a foundation, but rather an affiliation which defies religious and ethnic distinctions. Notwithstanding the indictment of Palestinians, and a tacit empathy with the Israeli enemy's dogged nation-building, the novel's surface rhetoric remains keyed to national liberation through armed struggle.  An imagined aftermath to the story has been written by Israeli novelist Sami Michael, a native Arabic-speaking Israeli Jew, in his Yonim be-Trafalgar (Pigeons in Trafalgar Square).

His article on Izz ad-Din al-Qassam, published in the PLO's Research Centre Magazine, Shu'un Filistiniyya (Palestinian Affairs), was influential in diffusing the  image of the former as a forerunner of the Palestinian armed struggle, and, according to Rashid Khalidi, consolidated the Palestinian narrative that tends to depict failure as a triumph.

Assassination 
On 8 July 1972, Kanafani, was assassinated in Beirut by the Mossad, the Israeli foreign intelligence service. When Kanafani turned on the ignition of his  Austin 1100, a grenade connected to the ignition switch detonated and in turn detonated a 3 kilo plastic bomb planted behind the bumper bar. Both Kanafani and his 17-year old niece Lamees Najim, who had been accompanying him, were killed.

The assassination was undertaken in response to the Lod Airport massacre, which was carried out by three members of the Japanese Red Army. At the time, Kanafani was the spokesperson of the PFLP, and the group claimed responsibility for the attack. Kanafani also appeared in photographs together with the three Japanese Red Army members shortly before they carried out the attack. According to Mark Ensalaco, Kanafani had justified tactics used by the attackers in July. Kameel  Nasr states that Kanafani, together with his deputy, Bassam Abu Sharif, had demanded in press conferences dealing with Palestinian hijackings common at the time, that Israel release prisoners; however, Nasr states, Kanafani and Abu Sharif had mellowed and had started speaking against indiscriminate violence. Several days after the Lod massacre, a picture of Kanafani together with one of the Japanese terrorists was circulated. Rumours circulated suggesting Lebanese Security forces had been complicit. Bassam Abu Sharif, who survived an attempt on his life two weeks later, suspected that the attempts  on Kanafani and later himself were ordered by Israel but had employed an Arab intermediary, perhaps Abu Ahmed Yunis; Yunis was executed by the PFLP in 1981.

Kanafani's obituary in Lebanon's The Daily Star wrote that: "He was a commando who never fired a gun, whose weapon was a ball-point pen, and his arena the newspaper pages."

On his death, several uncompleted novels were found among his Nachlass, one dating back as early as 1966.

Commemoration
A collection of Palestinian Resistance poems, The Palestinian Wedding, which took its title from the eponymous poem by Mahmoud Darwish, was published in his honor. He was the posthumous recipient of the Afro-Asia Writers' Conference 's Lotus Prize for Literature  in 1975.  Ghassan Kanafani's memory was upheld through the creation of the Ghassan Kanafani Cultural Foundation, which has since established eight kindergartens for the children of Palestinian refugees. His legacy lives on among the Palestinians, and he is considered one of the greatest modern Arabic authors.

Translations into English

Works in Arabic 

Note: Some Names are roughly Translated
 mawt sarir raqam 12, 1961 (موت سرير رقم 12, A Death in Bed No. 12)
 ard al-burtuqal al-hazin, 1963 (أرض البرتقال الحزين, The Land of Sad Oranges)
 rijal fi ash-shams, 1963 (رجال في الشمس, Men in the Sun)

 al-bab, 1964 (الباب, The Door)
 'aalam laysa lana, 1965 (عالمٌ ليس لنا, A World that is Not Ours)
 'adab al-muqawamah fi filastin al-muhtalla 1948–1966, 1966 (أدب المقاومة في فلسطين المحتلة 1948–1966, Literature of Resistance in Occupied Palestine)
 ma tabaqqa lakum, 1966 (ما تبقّى لكم, All That's Left to You)
 fi al-adab al-sahyuni, 1967 (في الأدب الصهيوني, On Zionist Literature)
 al-adab al-filastini al-muqawim that al-ihtilal: 1948–1968, 1968 (الأدب الفلسطيني المقاوم تحت الاحتلال 1948–1968, Palestinian Resistance Literature under the Occupation 1948–1968)
 'an ar-rijal wa-l-banadiq, 1968 (عن الرجال والبنادق, On Men and Rifles)
 umm sa'd, 1969 (أم سعد, Umm Sa'd)
 a'id ila Hayfa, 1970 (عائد إلى حيفا, Return to Haifa)
 al-a'ma wa-al-atrash, 1972 (الأعمى والأطرش, The Blind and the Deaf)
Barquq Naysan, 1972 (برقوق نيسان, The Apricots of April)
al-qubba'ah wa-l-nabi, 1973 (القبعة والنبي, The Hat and the Prophet) incomplete
thawra 1936-39 fi filastin, 1974 (ثورة 1936-39 في فلسطين, The Revolution of 1936–39 in Palestine)
jisr ila-al-abad, 1978 (جسر إلى الأبد, A Bridge to Eternity)
al-qamis al-masruq wa-qisas ukhra, 1982 (القميص المسروق وقصص أخرى, The Stolen Shirt and Other Stories)
'The Slave Fort' in Arabic Short Stories, 1983 (transl. by Denys Johnson-Davies)
 faris faris, 1996 (فارس فارس, Knight Knight)

2013 New edition of Ghassan Kanafani's complete works (Arabic Edition), published by Rimal Publications (Cyprus):

Novels:
 Men in the Sun | رجال في الشمس (Rimal Publications, 2013)  
 All That's Left to You | ماتبقى لكم (Rimal Publications, 2013)
 Umm Saad | أم سعد (Rimal Publications, 2013)
 The Lover | العاشق (Rimal Publications, 2013)
 Returning to Haifa | عائد الى حيفا (Rimal Publications, 2013)
 The Other Thing (Who Killed Laila Hayek?) | الشيء الآخر (Rimal Publications, 2013)

Short Stories
 Death of Bed No. 12 | موت سرير رقم ١٢ (Rimal Publications, 2013)
 Land of Sad Oranges | ارض البرتقال الحزين (Rimal Publications, 2013)
 A World Not Our Own | عالم ليس لنا (Rimal Publications, 2013)
 Of Men and Rifles | الرجال والبنادق (Rimal Publications, 2013)
 The Stolen Shirt | القميص المسروق (Rimal Publications, 2013)

Plays:
 A Bridge to Eternity | جسر إلى الأبد (Rimal Publications, 2013)
 The Door | الباب (Rimal Publications, 2013)
 The Hat and the Prophet | القبعه والنبي (Rimal Publications, 2013)

Studies
 Resistance Literature in Occupied Palestine 1948 -1966 | أدب المقاومة في فلسطين المحتلة ١٩٤٨-١٩٦٦ (Rimal Publications, 2013)
 Palestinian Literature of Resistance Under Occupation 1948 - 1968 | الأدب الفلسطيني المقاوم تحت الإحتلال ١٩٤٨ - ١٩٦٨ (Rimal Publications, 2013)
 In Zionist Literature | في الأدب الصهيوني (Rimal Publications, 2013)

Citations

References

External links 
George Hajjar, 1973:  Kanafani: Symbol of Palestine
Ghassan Kanafani Archive at marxists.org
Jaffa, Land of Oranges Kanafani on becoming a refugee.
New Jersey Solidarity - page on Kanafani with translated writings
Letter from Gaza - short story by Ghassan Kanafani (From NJS).
 The 1936-39 Revolt  - by Ghassan Kanafani (From NJS).
Tribute to Ghassan Kanafani - by S. Marwan, published in al-Hadaf on 22 July 1972. (From NJS)
Ghassan Kanafani: The Founder of the Modern Palestinian Novel, Yemen Times, 06.10.2008.

1936 births
1972 deaths
1972 murders in Lebanon
Deaths by car bomb in Lebanon
Arab communists
Palestinian literary critics
Palestinian novelists
Palestinian short story writers
Popular Front for the Liberation of Palestine members
Assassinated Palestinian people
Palestinian people murdered abroad
Palestinian refugees
People from Acre, Israel
20th-century novelists
People killed in Mossad operations
20th-century short story writers
Magazine founders
Palestinian people of Kurdish descent
Journalists killed while covering the Israeli–Palestinian conflict
Assassinated Palestinian journalists